The 39th National Film Awards was presented on 4 April 2016 by the Ministry of Information, Bangladesh to felicitate the best of Bangladeshi films released in the calendar year 2014. The awards were given to 29 personnel in 26 categories.

List of winners

Merit awards

See also
 Meril Prothom Alo Awards
 Ifad Film Club Award
 Babisas Award

References

External links

National Film Awards (Bangladesh) ceremonies
2014 film awards
2016 awards in Bangladesh
2016 in Dhaka
April 2016 events in Bangladesh